Ahmed Ezz Eldine Ali Ezzat (born July 23, 1971), is an Egyptian born actor often described as "the most versatile actor in the Middle East," with numerous accolades in his professional career spanning over 20 years and over 30 Film/TV prolific credits to his name. Ezz is one of the few actors from his region known for crafting originality in the characters he plays. His popularity stems from his versatility as an actor in comedy, drama, thriller and action film and television. In 2022, he starred in the epic action drama "Kira & El Gin" which became the highest grossing Egyptian film in the Middle East.

Acting career overview
At the beginning of his career, Ezz was quickly recognized as the young Arabic actor to watch, winning "Best Arabian Young Star of the Year" Award for his performance in "Malik Roti” in 2003. He also received the Best Supporting Actor award at the Cairo Intl' Film Festival in 2004 for his performance in "Girl's Love." In 2007, Ezz's breakthrough performances in "Al Harina (The Hostage)" and "The Ghost" where he won Lebanon's prestigious 2007 Murex d'Or Award for Best Arabian Cinema Actor and 2007 'Dear Guest' Best Actor of the YearAward, respectively, lauded him as Arab's premiere actors. His most recent hits include the "Sons of Rizk" blockbuster franchise (2015-2019), the undercover thriller "The Cell" (2018) in which Ezz' performance garnered him the Arabian Cinema Award for Best Actor, the war movie "The Passage" (2019), the cyber thriller "The Knower" (2021), the film noir "El Gareema" (2022) [US Title: "The Crime"] in which film critic Omar Bakry of El-Shai Magazine commended Ezz' complex performance stating he was:  "reborn into a sophisticated actor & has made it loud and clear why he’s become one of the top actors in the region"  and "Kira & El Gin" (2022) in which the film's unprecedented box office success in North America and the Arab World increased Ezz visibility worldwide.  

In 2022, Netflix decided to explore Love Stories across the Arab world with the critical acclaimed anthology series "Love, Life & Everything In Between" in which Ezz starred in the first story 'O, Brother' directed by Sandra Bassal.

Stage acting 
A thespian at heart, Ezz is no stranger to the Middle East's Broadway having recently starred in the popular production of "Aladdin" 

and it's prequel follow-up "Haddy Valentine” which debuted as a special live event series for Saudi Arabia in 2023.

Personal life 
As a child, Ezz was an avid swimmer and played competitive table tennis in Cairo. He always took an interest in acting since starring in a school play at age 8. Ezz majored in English at the Faculty of Arts later exploring his passion for the craft as a student at the prestigious Actors Studio. Ezz supported his early acting career as a professional model appearing in large brand campaigns and worked in the tourism industry before his career launch in Enas El-Degheidy's "Night Talk" in 2002 opposite glamour icon Youssra. Ezz was briefly married to Egyptian singer Angham before the marriage was annulled in 2012.

Filmography
 1997 : A Fish & 4 Sharks: One scene
 1998: Night's Talk : Two Scenes
 2002 : Mozakarat Moraheqa 
 2003 : Girl's Love
 2004 : Yom Al Karama 
 2004 : Sana Oula Nasb 
2004 : Shabab Take Away
 2005 : Malaki Iskendiriya 
 2005 : Al Bahithat An Al Horriya
 2006 : Al Rahina (The Hostage) 
 2007 : The Ghost
 2008 : Transit Prisoner 
 2009 : Badal Faqed 
 2010 : Ethalatha Yeshtaghalunha
 2011 : 365 Days of Happiness 
 2011 : Midnight Party
 2012 : The Benefit
 2012 : Helm Aziz 
 2013 : Al Hafla
 2013 : Hatuly Ragel
 2015 : Sons of Rizk
 2017: The Cell 
 2019 : El Mamar (US Title: The Passage)
 2019 : Sons of Rizk 2
 2021 : The Knower
 2022 : Kira & El Gin

Television
 2007 - 1998 : Zezinia - Guest of Honor
 2003 : Malak Rohi
 2009 : The Clinic - Guest of Honor
 2009 : Al Adham
2014 : The Excellence
2018 : Abo Omar Masry
2022: The Choice - Season 3
2022: Love, Life and Everything in Between (Netflix Anthology)

Animated Cartoon 
 2013 : Amir and the Journey of Legends

Radio

 2005: Film Arabi
 2007: Eid Fe Real Madrid
 2008: Sindbad Emad
 2009: Kolkasa Fe Wekalet NASA
 2011 : Mesbah Alaa El Din Zaazu
 2014 : Malek El Hawa
 2015: Gharam Ala Instagram 
 2016 : Tora Bora
 2017: Diezle
 2020: please ya englez

Advertising
 2007 : Pepsi- Ramadan Sehour
 2010 : Itisalat
 2011 : Ford
 2011 : Chevrolet Cruze
 2011 : Captin Shrimpo Kentucky
 2012 : KFC's
 2013 : Universal's
 2017: Mountain View
 2018 : Indigo We Egypt

Plays
 2000 : Yassine & Bahia
 2020 : Aladdin  
 2022 : Haddy Valentine

Awards

References

External links
 
 Ahmed Ezz at El Cinema
 https://archive.today/20130120063759/http://dailyuw.com/2002/6/6/ahmed-ezz-conquers-egyptian-cinema/

Living people
1971 births
Male actors from Cairo
Egyptian male film actors
Ain Shams University alumni
Egyptian male television actors
Egyptian male stage actors
Egyptian radio actors
Egyptian radio presenters
20th-century Egyptian male actors
21st-century Egyptian male actors